The African Distinguished Conduct Medal was a military decoration awarded to native soldiers of the Royal West African Frontier Force and the King's African Rifles for gallantry in action. Sometimes known as the Royal West African Frontier Force Distinguished Conduct Medal or King's African Rifles Distinguished Conduct Medal, it could also be awarded to the Somaliland Camel Corps and the Nyasaland Regiment. 

The medal was awarded until 1942 when it was replaced by the Imperial Distinguished Conduct Medal.

Recipients

From, the 1870s, a number of awards of the Imperial Distinguished Conduct Medal were made to soldiers of native African regiments, before the creation of the African Distinguished Conduct Medal in 1903.

At least 412 medals were awarded:
 King's African Rifles: Edward VII: 2; George V: 190.
 West Africa Frontier Force: Edward VII: 55; George V: 165.
 An unnamed George VI King's African Rifles version of the medal is known.

Awards of the medal were normally gazetted in the appropriate colonial gazette, with pre-1914 awards appearing in the London Gazette.

Appearance
The African Distinguished Conduct Medal was a circular silver disc,  in diameter, with the following design:Obverse: the effigy of the reigning sovereign.Reverse: the inscription in four lines FOR DISTINGUISHED CONDUCT IN THE FIELD.

See also
 King's African Rifles Long Service and Good Conduct Medal

References

External links
 West African Frontier Force DCM, awarded in 1915, National Army Museum.
 King's African Rifles Distinguished Conduct Medal, Medals of the World website.
 West African Frontier Force Distinguished Conduct Meda, Medals of the World website.

Military awards and decorations of the United Kingdom
Courage awards